Steve Reid (born 1944) is an American jazz drummer.

Steve Reid may also refer to:

 Steve Reid (video game producer), American video game producer
 Steve Reid (golfer) (born 1936), American former PGA Tour player
 Steve Reid (American football) (1914–2009), American football player
 Steve Reid (musician), American jazz drummer, best known as a founding member of The Rippingtons
 Steve Reid (soccer) (born 1955), American soccer player

See also
 Steven Reid (born 1981), Irish football player
 Steven Reid (harness racer), driver of standardbred racehorses in New Zealand
 Stephen Reid (disambiguation)
 Steve Reed (disambiguation)